Arthur Law was a Welsh field hockey player. He won a bronze medal at the 1908 Summer Olympics in London.

References

External links

Year of birth unknown
Year of death missing
Welsh male field hockey players
Olympic field hockey players of Great Britain
British male field hockey players
Field hockey players at the 1908 Summer Olympics
Olympic bronze medallists for Great Britain
Olympic medalists in field hockey
Welsh Olympic medallists
Medalists at the 1908 Summer Olympics